The Washington Hospital is a major hospital and healthcare provider in Washington County, Pennsylvania.  It is located in the City of Washington at 155 Wilson Avenue. The hospital has a staff of 6,200.

References

Hospitals in Pennsylvania
Buildings and structures in Washington County, Pennsylvania